Paraspadella is a genus of chaetognaths in the family Spadellidae. Paraspadella was originally considered as Spadella before a revision separated that genus into three genera: Spadella, Paraspadella, and Gephyrospadella, the last of which is now synonymised to Paraspadella. The initial division was based on previous knowledge of three groups of Spadella, in a similar manner in which Sagitta was divided into a family of genera. Paraspadella is differentiated from Spadella by the presence of disparate (digital) adhesive organs, present in the former to various degrees, but entirely absent in the latter.

Species
Paraspadella anops Bowman & Bieri, 1989
Paraspadella caecafea (von Salvini-Plawen, 1986)
Paraspadella gotoi Casanova, 1990
Paraspadella johnstoni (Mawson, 1944)
Paraspadella legazpichessi (Alvariño, 1981)
Paraspadella nana (Owre, 1963)
Paraspadella pimukatharos (Alvariño, 1987)
Paraspadella pulchella (Owre, 1963)
Paraspadella schizoptera (Conant, 1895)
Paraspadella sheardi (Mawson, 1944)

References

Chaetognatha